A silhouette racing car is a race car which, although bearing a superficial resemblance to a production model, differs mechanically in fundamental ways. The purpose of silhouette cars is to provide a manufacturer with a tangible link to their consumer product offerings so as to derive maximum marketing benefit from their investment in the sport. They also provide spectators with familiar, identifiable car models.

Construction 
Silhouette cars often employ radically different chassis construction techniques, such as tubular space frames or carbon-fibre tubs in place of regular monocoques, and many also have completely different drivetrain configurations than their road-going counterparts. The body shells themselves are generally made of lightweight materials such as fibreglass or carbon fibre, and often, few parts (or none at all) are shared between the race and road versions of the cars. These changes are aimed at improving the desirable characteristics of the vehicle, such as increasing the stiffness of the chassis or the output of the engine.

Silhouette racing series 
Entire championship fields can consist of silhouettes. Sometimes, only a single class in a multi-class field may permit silhouettes.  Notable racing classes where silhouette cars have been used include Trans-Am, NASCAR, Stock Car Brasil, Group 5, Group B, DTM, JGTC/Super GT, monster trucks and the Australian Supercars Championship.  

Due to homologation rules (e.g. Group B rally cars), some silhouette racing cars, such as the Lancia 037 and Lancia Delta S4, also end up being sold as road cars.

Gallery

References

Racing cars
Modified vehicles
Motorsport terminology